Little Dog can refer to:

Canis Minor, the constellation
Little Dog (TV series), a Canadian television comedy-drama series
LittleDog, a small quadruped robot developed by Boston Dynamics for research in 2010
Little Dog Mountain, in Montana
Little Dog Island, in Tasmania
Little Seal Dog Island, in the British Virgin Islands

See also 
Big Dog (disambiguation)